Kurt Robert Achilles Giambastiani (born December 4, 1958) is a novelist whose works blend elements of science fiction, fantasy, adventure, and romance.  Giambastiani's work is also usually imbued with a strong historical context, resulting in many of his novels being classified as alternate history, historical fantasy, or historical fiction.

Biography
Born in San Rafael, California, Giambastiani first embarked on a career in music.  He studied classical music at San Francisco State University before transferring to the Jerusalem Academy of Music and Dance in Jerusalem, Israel.  He moved to Seattle, Washington in 1984.

Upon returning to the United States from Israel, he spent several years as a violist with regional orchestras, including five years as principal violist with the Bellevue Philharmonic in Washington State.  At the same time, Giambastiani built a second career as a software developer.

Giambastiani switched from music to writing in the early 1990s, concentrating on short stories in science fiction and fantasy.  After several publications of his short fiction, he turned to novels and, in 2001, debuted with The Year the Cloud Fell, the first volume in his Fallen Cloud Saga, which was a finalist for the Endeavour Award.

Bibliography

Novels

Series novels
 The Fallen Cloud Saga
 The Year the Cloud Fell (2001) Roc Books
 The Spirit of Thunder (2002) Roc Books
 Shadow of the Storm (2003) Roc Books
 From the Heart of the Storm (2004) Roc Books - Renamed The Cry of the Wind (2012) CreateSpace Books
 Beneath a Wounded Sky (2012) CreateSpace Books
 The Ploughman Chronicles
 Ploughman's Son (2005) Mouse Road Press
 Ploughman King (2006) Mouse Road Press

Standalone novels
 Dreams of the Desert Wind (2004) Fairwood Press
 Unraveling Time (2006) Mouse Road Press

Short works
 "Sum of the Angles" (Vision, 1991)
 "Supplanter" (Science Fiction Review, Winter 1991)
 "Veiled Glimpses" (Midnight Zoo, 1992)
 "Still Falling" (Air Fish, Catseye Books, 1993)
 "Spencer's Peace" (Dragon, March 1994)
 "Bio-Dome" (Year 2000 1995)
 "Intaglio" (Tomorrow, Oct 1995)
 "Of Light and Color" (Talebones, Fall 1997)
 "Long Distance" (Talebones, Fall 1998)
 "Ploughman's Son" (MZB's Fantasy Magazine 1999)
 "The Duenna" (Bygone Days, 2002)
 "The Revitalization of Emily" (Oceans of the Mind 2002)
 "Destrier's Will" (Bygone Days, 2004)
 "The Text" (Oceans of the Mind, 2004)
"The Book of Solomon" (The Timberline Review, Autumn 2018)

External links
 Kurt R.A. Giambastiani's official website
 Kurt Giambastiani's official blog
 Kurt R.A. Giambastiani on Facebook
 
 OSFCI's Endeavour Award
 Short story online: "Spencer's Peace"
 Short story online: "Intaglio"
 Excerpt from Unraveling Time
 Excerpt from Dreams of the Desert Wind
 Excerpt from Ploughman's Son
 Excerpt from The Year the Cloud Fell
 Jerusalem Academy of Music and Dance
 San Francisco State University

1958 births
21st-century American novelists
American fantasy writers
American male novelists
American science fiction writers
Living people
Writers from San Rafael, California
Writers from Seattle
21st-century American male writers
Novelists from Washington (state)